John L. Hagan is an American sociologist focusing on criminology. He is currently the John D. MacArthur Professor of Sociology and Law at Northwestern University and University Professor Emeritus of Law and Sociology at University of Toronto and also formerly the Dahlstrom Distinguished Professor of Sociology and Law at University of North Carolina (1994-96).

He is an Elected Fellow to the American Academy of Arts and Sciences, Royal Society of Canada, Canadian Institute for Advanced Research and American Society of Criminology. In May 2017, he was inducted into the National Academy of Sciences.
He was the founding Editor of the Annual Review of Law and Social Science in 2005 and  served until 2018.

References

External links

Year of birth missing (living people)
Living people
Northwestern University faculty
University of Alberta alumni
University of Illinois alumni
American criminologists
Members of the United States National Academy of Sciences
Fellows of the American Academy of Arts and Sciences
Winners of the Stockholm Prize in Criminology
Annual Reviews (publisher) editors